Megali Doxipara (Greek: Μεγάλη Δοξιπάρα) is a village in the municipality of Orestiada in the northern part of the Evros regional unit in Greece. Megali Doxipara is located about 23 km west of the centre of Orestiada. The nearest villages are Doxa to the south, Chandras to the east and Zoni to the west.

Population

History

Before 1913 it was ruled by the Ottomans. The village was known as Dugantzi then. After a brief period of Bulgarian rule between 1913 and 1919, it became part of Greece. As a result, its Bulgarian and Turkish population was exchanged with Greek refugees, mainly from today's Turkey.

See also
List of settlements in the Evros regional unit

External links
Megali Doxipara on GTP Travel Pages

References

Populated places in Evros (regional unit)
Orestiada